The  Dallas Texans season was the third season for the Texans. They finished with a record of 5–5 winning the Western Division. The Texans would lose in the AFL Semi-finals vs the Detroit Drive.

Regular season

Schedule

Standings

z – clinched homefield advantage
y – clinched division title
x – clinched playoff spot

Playoffs

Roster

Awards

External links
1992 Dallas Texans on ArenaFan

Dallas Texans
Dallas Texans
Dallas Texans (Arena) seasons